National Route 393 is a national highway of Japan connecting Otaru, Hokkaidō and Kutchan, Hokkaidō in Japan, with a total length of 51.7 km (32.12 mi).

References

National highways in Japan
Roads in Hokkaido